Tidewater Tramp was a Canadian children's adventure television series which aired on CBC Television from 1959 to 1961.

Premise
This Vancouver-produced series features the adventures of Captain Martin (Reg McReynolds) and his tramp steamer the Flying Kestrel. He carried cargo along the Inside Passage of British Columbia with the assistance of his daughter Gail (Maureen Cook) and coast cadet Peter (Robert William Chambers).

Most scenes were recorded in studio supplemented by location shots such as scenes from a British Columbia freighter.

Scheduling
This half-hour series was broadcast Fridays at 5:00 p.m. (Eastern) from 2 October 1959 until 29 June 1962, omitting the season between March 1960 and October 1961.

References

External links
 
 

CBC Television original programming
1950s Canadian children's television series
1960s Canadian children's television series
1959 Canadian television series debuts
1962 Canadian television series endings
Black-and-white Canadian television shows
Television shows filmed in Vancouver